Gustav Adolf Queck (18 March 1822, Zadelsdorf – 1897, Treptow an der Rega) was a German educator and classical philologist.

From 1841 to 1845 he studied philology at the University of Jena. Following graduation he worked as a schoolteacher in Sondershausen, where in 1853 he received the title of professor. In 1866 he became a school prorector in Pyritz, and during the following year was named director of the newly founded gymnasium in Dramburg.

Published works 
 De Euripidis Electra, 1844 – Euripides' Electra. 
 Beiträge zur Charakteristik des Livius, 1847 – Contribution to the characteristics of Livy.
 Ferdinand Gotthelf Hand nach seinem Leben und Wirken, 1852 – Biography of Ferdinand Gotthelf Hand.
 C. Julii Caesaris Commentariorum de bello civili libri tres, 1853 – edition of Julius Caesar's "Commentarii de Bello Civili", book III. 
 Zweiter Beitrag zur Charakteristik des Livius, 1853 – Second contribution to the characteristics of Livy.
 Publius Papinius Statius (two volumes), 1854 – edition of Statius (Silvae, Achilleis, Thebais). 
 De Madvigii emendationibus Livianis disp. Lib. I-III., 1861.

References 

1822 births
1897 deaths
University of Jena alumni
People from Zeulenroda-Triebes
German classical philologists
People from Trzebiatów